Chong-Bülölü is a village in Osh Region of Kyrgyzstan. It is part of the Alay District. Its population was 911 in 2021.

Nearby towns and villages include Kichi-Bülölü (3 miles) and Askaly (7 miles).

References

External links 
Satellite map at Maplandia.com

Populated places in Osh Region